Music for Psychedelic Therapy is the sixth studio album by English electronic music producer Jon Hopkins, released on 12 November 2021 by Domino Recording Company.

Release
On 2 September 2021, Jon Hopkins announced the release of his sixth studio album, along with the first single "Sit Around the Fire". Of the single, which features collaborations by East Forest and Ram Dass, Hopkins said:

"Sit Around the Fire" exists from one of the deep synchronicities that ushered this thing (Music for Psychedelic Therapy) into being. I was contacted by East Forest, who had spent some time with Ram Dass in Hawaii before he passed. He was given access to several lesser-heard talks from the 70s, and asked to set them to music. He sent me some starting points, including the beautiful choral vocals he recorded which open the piece. I put my headphones on and with Ram Dass' voice inside my head, I sat at the piano and improvised. What you hear is the first thing that came out - it just appeared in response to the words."

The album was premiered at L-Acoustics Creations in Westlake Village, California at a Pitchblack Playback album listening session.

Critical reception

Music for Psychedelic Therapy was met with "generally favorable" reviews from critics. At Metacritic, which assigns a weighted average rating out of 100 to reviews from mainstream publications, this release received an average score of 79 based on 13 reviews. Aggregator AnyDecentMusic? gave the release a 7.5 out of 10 based on a critical consensus of 14 reviews.

Year-end lists

Track listing

Charts

See also
 Music therapy
 Psychedelic therapy

References

Further reading 

 

2021 albums
Jon Hopkins albums
Domino Recording Company albums
Ambient albums by English artists
Electronic albums by English artists